Sybille's Night (French: La nuit de Sybille) is a 1947 French comedy film directed by Jean-Paul Paulin and starring Lucien Baroux, Paulette Élambert and Daniel Gélin. The film's sets were designed by the art director René Moulaert.

Synopsis
A young burglar and his associate, a former antique dealer, break into a great house where they encounter Sybille who has just escaped from reformatory.

Cast
 Lucien Baroux as 	Chambon
 Paulette Élambert as 	Sibylle
 Daniel Gélin as 	Stany
 Pierre Larquey as 	Ancelin
 Manuel Gary as Jacques
 Odette Barencey as La paysanne
 Defresne as 	Le paysan

References

Bibliography 
 Rège, Philippe. Encyclopedia of French Film Directors, Volume 1. Scarecrow Press, 2009.

External links 
 

1947 films
1947 comedy films
French comedy films
1940s French-language films
Films directed by Jean-Paul Paulin
French black-and-white films
1940s French films